The 2013 Asian Tour was the 19th season of the modern Asian Tour, the main men's professional golf tour in Asia excluding Japan, since it was established in 1995.

Schedule
The following table lists official events during the 2013 season.

Order of Merit
The Order of Merit was based on prize money won during the season, calculated in U.S. dollars.

Awards

Notes

References

External links
The Asian Tour's official site

Asian Tour
Asian Tour
Asian Tour
Asian Tour
Asian Tour
Asian Tour
Asian Tour
Asian Tour